Caltha is a genus of rhizomatous perennial flowering plants in the family Ranunculaceae ("buttercup family"), to which ten species have been assigned. They occur in moist environments in temperate and cold regions of both the Northern and Southern Hemispheres. Their leaves are generally heart-shaped or kidney-shaped, or are characteristically diplophyllous (the auricles of the leaf blades form distinctly inflexed appendages). Flowers are star shaped and mostly yellow to white. True petals and nectaries are missing but the five or more sepals are distinctly colored. As usual in the buttercup family there is a circle of stamens around (two to twenty-five) free carpels.

Description 
Caltha species are hairless, dwarf to medium size (1–80 cm high) perennial herbs, with alternate leaves. These leaves are simple (in all Northern Hemisphere species), or have one pair of lobes at the base (in C. sagittata) which is mostly oriented at a straight angle to the larger top lobe but is sometimes in the same plane (in some of its northern populations), or the basal lobes are merged with the top lobe to form two (occasionally three) appendages (in all remaining species) which are attached next to the midvein, with the adaxial surfaces of top lobe and appendages facing each other. This condition of the Southern Hemisphere species is referred to as diplophylly. All species have stalked basal leaves, and some also have one or few leaves on the flowerstalk. The flowers are single on a short stalk in the middle of the rosette of basal leaves (Southern Hemisphere species) or in a mostly few-flowered corymb, without or with one or few mostly sessile leaflike stipules. Northern Hemisphere species have kidney to (elongated) hart-shaped leaves and stipules, with simple toothed or scalloped margins. Southern Hemisphere species between them show a variety in leafshapes. In C. appendiculata the top lobe is regularly more or less trifid, with an indent at the tip of each segment, but it is also often spoon-shaped with an entire margin with a more or less retuse tip. The top lobe in C. dionaeifolia is split into ovate left and right halves, which are distinctly folded towards each other (plicate), and have a concave upper surface, an entire margin with toothlike hairs regularly spaced around its margins while the appendages are similar in shape but ½–⅔× as large. C. sagittata has wide arrowhead-shaped leaves with an entire margin and appendages triangular and about ⅔× as large, C. intriloba has narrow arrowhead-shaped to elongate ovate leaves with a slightly scalloped margin, with lanceolate-triangular appendages ⅔× as long. C. novae-zelandiae has spade-shaped leaves a bit longer than wide with a round and slightly retuse top and a slightly scalloped margin with appendages half as long, triangular with a blunt tip. Finally C. obtusa also has spade-shaped leaves, with a round and slightly retuse top, but these are about as wide as long and are distinctly scalloped particularly towards the base, and appendages about ¾× as long with a likewise scalloped outer margin and a straight entire inner margin. The actinomorphic flowers lack true petals and nectaries, but the five to nine (sometimes as little as four or as much as thirteen) sepals are distinctly colored yellow (rarely orange or red) to white (sometimes tinged pink or magenta). The shape of the sepals varies between broadly ovate, obtuse, oblong to lanceolate. The number of stamens range between 6–9 in the smallest species (C. dionaeifolia) and 60-120 in the largest (C. palustris) and likewise does the number of carpels range between 2-5 and 5-25. Stamens encircle the carpels and both are planted on a flat floral base. The pollen is yellow and tricolpate except in C. leptosepala ssp. howellii that has pollen with rounded apertures all over the surface (pantoporate) or an intermediate type (pantocolporate), and in C. palustris var. alba, that shows both pollen types. Each carpel contains several ovules set along the ventral suture. These mostly develop into sessile follicles, with elliptic to globular light brown to black seeds without wings, dependent on the species between ½–1½ mm. In C. scaposa follicles are stipitate and in C. leptosepala short stipitate to sessile. C. natans grows floating in fresh waters or on mud, but all other species are terrestrials that grow in moist soils.

Key to the species 
This key makes use of the taxonomic opinions and characters described in Smit (1973).

Taxonomy

Taxonomic history 
The oldest description that is generally acknowledged in the botanical literature dates from 1700 under the name Populago by Joseph Pitton de Tournefort in part 1 of his Institutiones rei herbariae. He distinguished between P. flore major, P. flore minor and P. flore plena, and already says all of these are synonymous to Caltha palustris, without mentioning any previous author. As a plant name published before 1 May 1753, Populago Tourn. is invalid. And so is the first description as Caltha palustris by Carl Linnaeus in his Genera Plantarum of 1737. But Linnaeus re-describes the species under the same name in Species Plantarum of 1 May 1753, thus providing the correct name.

Caltha palustris is a highly variable species. When the growing season is shorter, plants are generally much smaller and may root at the nodes of the stems after flowering. Through history, many proposals have been made to split it into different (often numerous) taxa. Popular characters to distinguish between taxa concern the follicle. Most of the differences between populations are probably phenotypic adaptations to particular circumstances without a genetic basis. Variability within populations is also considerable. Varieties that are widely recognised are C. palustris var. palustris, C. palustris var. radicans (small plants with decumbent stems rooting at the nodes), C. palustris var. araneosa (big plants with erect stems forming young plants at the nodes), C. palustris var. alba (with white flowers) and C. palustris var. purpurea (with magenta flowers).

Caltha leptosepala also is highly variable. There may be mostly one or mostly two flowers per stem, many lanceolate sepals or fewer ovate sepals, smaller hart-shaped or larger kidney-shaped leaves, and pollen may be of two different types. Populations on the US westcoast and the US Rocky Mountains consistently differ from each other by fixed combinations of these character states and two subspecies are distinguished: ssp. leptosepala and ssp. howellii. Curiously, these fixed combinations cannot be found in the Canadian Rocky Mountains and in Alaska. For this reason the subspecies status is generally preferred over distinguishing a separate species (Caltha biflora).

Caltha sagittata has a rather large distribution. Usually the leaves have so called appendages, which are lobes at the base that are at a sharp angle with the top lobe. In some northern forms these appendages are in the same plane as the remainder of the leafblade, and these plants are sometimes recognised as C. alata. Some character states gradually change over its distribution area, and the angle of the basal lobes does not seem to be special in this respect.

The remaining species vary less and have not been divided into subtaxa.

Modern classification 
Historically, the genus Caltha has been divided over two sections: Populago (now Caltha) that included all Northern Hemisphere species, and Psychrophila that contained all Southern Hemisphere species. The latter is sometimes regarded as a separate genus, but other authors find the morphological differences too small to legitimate that status. Support for both opinions can still be found all over scientific and colloquial sources.

Phylogeny 
Genetic analysis suggest that three monophyletic groups can be identified. C. natans turns out to be sister to all other species. It also turns out that C. leptosepala is the sister of all Southern Hemisphere species and should be moved into the Psychrophila group. Within that section the New Zealand and Australian species form one cluster, C. appendiculata and C. dionaeifolia form a second cluster, while the third South American species, C. sagittata, is sister to both these clusters. The remaining Northern Hemisphere species, C. palustris and C. scaposa make up the new content of the Caltha group. This suggests the genus originates in the Northern Hemisphere, and dispersed from North America to South America and from there to New Zealand and Australia. Relations between the species are represented by the following tree.

Reassigned species 
Some species that were described as Caltha have been reassigned to other genera later on.
 C. bisma = Aconitum undetermined sp.
 C. camschatica = Oxygraphis glacialis
 C. codua = Aconitum undetermined sp.
 C. glacialis = Oxygraphis glacialis
 C. hiranoi = Ranunculus ficaria
 C. nirbisia = Aconitum undetermined sp.
 C. officinalis = Calendula officinalis Etymology 

 Distribution Caltha species are found in the cold and temperate regions of the Northern Hemisphere, the Andes and Patagonia, and alpine areas in Australia and New Zealand. It is absent from lower altitudes in the tropics and subtropics, in Africa, on Greenland and some other arctic island, from Antarctica and subantarctic islands and from oceanic islands. C. natans occurs in Siberia and North America, but not in Europe. C. palustris has the widest distribution and is present in the cold and temperate regions of the Northern Hemisphere, but cannot be found in the Western United States. C. scaposa is an alpine species with a limited distribution on the south-eastern rim of the Highland of Tibet. Caltha leptosepala occurs in western North-America from Alaska to California and Colorado. C. sagittata is another species that occurs in moist alpine meadows, in this case from Colombia to Tierra del Fuego, growing at less altitude further from the equator. C. appendiculata occurs in the moist mountains and hills of southern Patagonia. The remaining four species all have limited distribution areas: C. dionaeifolia on the southern tip of Patagonia, C. introloba in the Australian Alps and on Tasmania, C. novae-zelandiae in the mountains of North and South Island of New Zealand, while C. obtusa is restricted to the South Island. Caltha palustris is cultivated as a garden ornamental in all temperate regions and may sometimes have escaped.

 Ecology 
Information about the ecology of Caltha species is scarce except for C. palustris. This species contains a number of noxious chemicals such as anemonin, a trait it shares with other ranunculids, and this is probably the reason members of the entire family are avoided by vertebrate animals. Beetles and mining fly larvae cause little damage in C. palustris. Pollination is mediated by a lot of different insects, but most prominently by flies, bees and beetles.
Although it was suggested that pollination in C. palustris could be assisted by rain, there is also proof for self-infertility. When ripe follicles open, they form a "splash cup" from which seeds are expelled if raindrops hit them at the right angle. C. palustris seeds also have some spongy tissue that makes them float on water, until they wash up in a location that may be suitable for this species to grow. C. introloba'' was shown to have a life cycle that is adapted to snow cover and a short growing season. Flowerbuds have fully developed when the first snow remains, so that when it melts in spring the flowers can open immediately.
Seeds germinate better and faster after a cold period.

References

External links 

 
Ranunculaceae genera